Sweet Secrets was a toy introduced by Galoob in 1984 which transformed from jewelry, makeup and other girl-oriented objects to animals, girls with hair, and playsets. This was done by opening the object and unfolding the head, arms, and legs. The playsets included a jewelry box which transformed into a dollhouse, a play phone which transformed into a nursery, a comb which transformed into a bed, and a photo frame which transformed into a pool. In Fall 2007, Play Along Toys re-released the Sweet Secrets series; but instead of charms, they were tiny dolls that could fit into lipstick tubes and change purses.

Charms
Shimmer
Dazzle
Starshine
Cat Trina
Starburst (Horse)
Starshine
Puppy Shines Blue plastic heart with red "gemstone"; changes into puppy
Pinkie Panda Lavender octagon with golden "gemstone"; changes into panda
Star Beam
Sparkle Heart
Cristal Bright
Glitter Miss
Shinie Mouse
Glitter Kitty

Vanity Sets

Brush~Car

Comb bed
Flashie charm

Fashion Sets

Hairdryer~Patio
Shinie charm

Jewelry Box~House

Purse Playpark

AM/FM Stereo Boombox~Hair Salon

Telephone~Twin Baby Nursery

Pencil~School House

External links

Transforming toys
1980s toys
Products introduced in 1984